Minuscule 605 (in the Gregory-Aland numbering), O 5 (von Soden), is a Greek minuscule manuscript of the New Testament, on parchment. Palaeographically it has been assigned to the 10th century. The manuscript has complex contents. Formerly it was labeled by 126a and 153p.

Description 

The codex contains the text of the Acts of the Apostles, Catholic epistles, Pauline epistles on 394 parchment leaves (size ). The text is written in two columns per page, 21 lines per page. The biblical text is surrounded by a catena.

The order of books: Acts, Catholic, and Pauline epistles. Epistle to the Hebrews is placed after Epistle to Philemon.

Text 

The Greek text of the codex is a representative of the Byzantine text-type. Aland placed it in Category V.

History 

The manuscript belonged to the Medicis. The manuscript was brought from Constantinople to Paris.

The manuscript was added to the list of New Testament manuscripts by Johann Martin Augustin Scholz. Cramer used the catena to the Second Epistle to the Corinthians. It was examined and described by Paulin Martin. Gregory saw the manuscript in 1885.

The manuscript currently is housed at the Bibliothèque nationale de France (Gr. 216), at Paris.

See also 

 List of New Testament minuscules
 Biblical manuscript
 Textual criticism

References

Further reading 

 

Greek New Testament minuscules
10th-century biblical manuscripts
Bibliothèque nationale de France collections